Derrick Lewis (born February 7, 1985) is an American professional mixed martial artist. He currently competes in the Heavyweight division in the Ultimate Fighting Championship (UFC), where he currently holds the record for most knockouts in UFC history. A professional competitor since 2010, Lewis has also competed for Bellator MMA and Legacy FC, where he was the Heavyweight Champion. As of February 14, 2023, he is #11 in the UFC heavyweight rankings.

Background
Born and raised as one of seven siblings, the second oldest, by a single mother in New Orleans, Louisiana, Lewis was troubled growing up and was often involved in street fighting. In 1998, Lewis and his family relocated to Houston, Texas. At the age of 17, Lewis began training in boxing and was preparing for his first amateur fight when the gym unexpectedly shut down. Two weeks after graduating from Cy-Springs High School, Lewis was charged with aggravated assault, and was placed on probation. Two years later, while attending Kilgore College on a full scholarship for football, Lewis violated his probation and was sentenced to five years in prison, but ended up serving three and a half. A week after being released, Lewis was introduced to mixed martial arts by a friend and, while working as a tow-truck driver, continued with boxing under the tutelage of George Foreman. After dominating in his first professional mixed martial arts fight, Lewis decided to focus on mixed martial arts.

Mixed martial arts career

Early career
Lewis began his journey in MMA in late 2009, when he made his debut as an amateur against Jay Ross at LSAMMA on October 16, 2009. He lost the fight via TKO (doctor stoppage). He then faced Tim Buchanan at the United States American Combat Association event on January 30, 2010. He won via TKO.

After turning professional in 2010, Lewis would compile a fight record of 4–1 before signing with Bellator MMA in May 2010.

Bellator Fighting Championships
Lewis was scheduled to make his promotional debut at Bellator 45 on May 21, 2011, against Brazilian Thiago Santos. However, the bout was canceled when Santos had to pull out due to an injury.

Lewis faced Tony Johnson at Bellator 46 on June 25, 2011. He lost the bout via unanimous decision.

Lewis compiled a record of 6–0 with one no-contest after leaving Bellator, most notably winning and successfully defending the Legacy FC Heavyweight Championship. He was then signed to the UFC.

Ultimate Fighting Championship
Lewis was scheduled to make his promotional debut against Nandor Guelmino at UFC Fight Night: Condit vs. Kampmann 2 on August 28, 2013. However, the bout was canceled as Lewis had to pull out due to an injury.

Lewis instead made his debut at UFC on Fox: Werdum vs. Browne on April 19, 2014, against Jack May. He won via TKO in the first round.

In his second fight for the promotion, Lewis faced Guto Inocente at The Ultimate Fighter 19 Finale on July 6, 2014. He won the fight via KO in the first round.

Lewis faced Matt Mitrione on September 5, 2014, at UFC Fight Night 50. Mitrione quickly defeated Lewis via first-round knockout.

Lewis faced Ruan Potts on February 28, 2015, at UFC 184. He won the fight via TKO in the second round.

Lewis next had a rematch with Shawn Jordan on June 6, 2015, at UFC Fight Night 68. In their first encounter on the regional circuit in 2010, Lewis lost by unanimous decision. Lewis lost the fight via TKO.

Lewis was expected to face Anthony Hamilton on October 3, 2015, at UFC 192. However, Hamilton was forced out of the bout with an injury and was replaced by Viktor Pešta. Lewis won the fight via TKO in the third round.

Lewis faced Damian Grabowski on February 6, 2016, at UFC Fight Night 82. Lewis dominated the fight, winning via TKO in the first round.

Lewis next faced Gabriel Gonzaga on April 10, 2016, at UFC Fight Night 86. He won via KO in the first round. Subsequently, Lewis earned his first Performance of the Night bonus.

Lewis faced Roy Nelson on July 7, 2016, at UFC Fight Night 90. He won the fight via split decision.

Lewis was expected to face Marcin Tybura on October 15, 2016, at UFC Fight Night 97. However, the promotion announced on October 6 that they had canceled the event entirely.

Lewis faced Shamil Abdurakhimov on December 9, 2016, in the main event at UFC Fight Night 102. After losing the first three rounds, he won the fight via TKO in the fourth round.

Lewis faced Travis Browne on February 19, 2017, in the main event at UFC Fight Night 105. He won the fight via knockout in the second round. Both participants were awarded Fight of the Night for their performance.

Lewis faced Mark Hunt on June 11, 2017, in the main event at UFC Fight Night 110. He lost the fight via TKO in the fourth round. Despite the loss, the win earned Lewis his second consecutive Fight of the Night bonus award. After the loss, during his post-fight interview, Lewis announced that he was likely retiring from mixed martial arts. Later in the month, Lewis revealed that he ultimately decided to continue fighting.

Lewis was expected to face Fabrício Werdum on October 7, 2017, at UFC 216. On the day of the fight, Lewis was forced out of the bout due to a back injury.

Lewis faced Marcin Tybura on February 18, 2018, at UFC Fight Night 126. He won the fight via technical knockout in the third round. This win earned him the Performance of the Night bonus.

Lewis faced Francis Ngannou on July 7, 2018, at UFC 226. He won the fight via unanimous decision, but the fight itself was heavily criticized for the lack of action in both fighters with Lewis only landing 20 strikes, and Ngannou landing 11.

Lewis faced Alexander Volkov on October 6, 2018, at UFC 229. After being behind on the judges' scorecards and visibly hurt multiple times, Lewis won the fight via knockout in the closing seconds of the third round. This win earned him the Performance of the Night award.

Lewis faced Daniel Cormier for the UFC Heavyweight Championship on November 3, 2018, at UFC 230. He lost the fight by rear-naked choke in the second round, marking the first submission loss of his professional MMA career.

Lewis signed a new contract with the UFC after the title shot. As the first fight of his new contract, Lewis faced Junior dos Santos in the main event of UFC Fight Night 146 on March 9, 2019. He lost the fight via TKO in the second round. This fight earned him the Fight of the Night award.

Lewis faced Blagoy Ivanov on November 2, 2019, at UFC 244. He won the fight via split decision.

Lewis faced Ilir Latifi on February 8, 2020, at UFC 247. He won the bout via unanimous decision.

Lewis faced Aleksei Oleinik on August 8, 2020, at UFC Fight Night 174. He won the bout via TKO early in round two. Lewis also set the record for most knockouts by a heavyweight in UFC history.

Lewis was scheduled to face Curtis Blaydes on November 28, 2020, at UFC on ESPN 18. However, the day before the fight, Blaydes tested positive for COVID-19 and the bout was scrapped from the card. The pair faced off at UFC Fight Night 185 on February 20, 2021. Lewis won the fight via knockout in the second round. This win earned him the Performance of the Night award.

Lewis faced Ciryl Gane on August 7, 2021, at UFC 265 for the Interim UFC Heavyweight Championship. Lewis lost the fight via technical knockout in round three.

Lewis faced Chris Daukaus on December 18, 2021, at UFC Fight Night 199. Lewis won the fight via knockout in the first round. With his knockout win over Daukaus, Lewis earned the record for the most knockouts in UFC history regardless of weight division, with 13 altogether. When asked by Michael Bisping in his UFC Fight Night 199 Octagon interview, how he felt about achieving the record, Lewis replied "I’m feeling good, and I’m also happy that I’m the first fighter, clean fighter, to be number one in knockouts".

Lewis faced Tai Tuivasa on February 12, 2022, at UFC 271 in Houston, Texas. Lewis lost the fight via knockout in the second round.

Lewis faced Sergei Pavlovich on July 30, 2022 at UFC 277. He lost the fight via TKO, just 55 seconds into the first round, however there was controversy as the stoppage by referee Dan Miragliotta was considered premature by fighters and fans alike. Lewis received the Crypto.com "Fan Bonus of the Night" award paid in bitcoin of US$10,000 for third place.

Lewis was next expected to face Sergey Spivak at UFC Fight Night 215 on November 19, 2022. However, Lewis was forced to pull out of the event due to non-COVID, non-weight cutting illness and the bout was canceled. The pair was rescheduled for UFC Fight Night 218 on February 4, 2023. Lewis lost the fight via an arm-triangle choke in round one, and he did not land a single strike during the fight.

Fighting style
Lewis has been characterized as a 'classic heavyweight' owing to his knockout power and physique. Former welterweight title contender and analyst Dan Hardy described him as a "wrecking ball", adding "Every time we've spoken about Derrick Lewis before, regardless of whether he's fighting Daniel Cormier, or whether he's fighting Volkov, or whether he's fighting Ciryl Gane, the same thing is always present. If he lands that right hand, it's game over."

Lewis greatly prefers stand-up fighting, which he refers to as "swangin' and banging", and has been noted by fans and commentators for his surprising ability to seemingly shrug off the grappling/wrestling offense of his opponents while in the bottom position, and simply 'stand up'. However, analysts have noted that when facing fighters with a background in folkstyle wrestling, such as Daniel Cormier, Lewis finds it more difficult to escape the bottom position. Nonetheless, Lewis appeared to simply 'standup' when threatened with a crucifix position by Roy Nelson, a fighter with a wrestling pedigree.

Personal life
Lewis married his long-time girlfriend in Honolulu, Hawaii, on June 17, 2017. They have two sons and one daughter.

During the flooding caused by Hurricane Harvey in 2017, Lewis pulled an estimated 100 people from the flood waters in Houston, Texas via his lifted truck.

On May 18, 2021, Lewis was returning to his car after a workout when he discovered a man allegedly trying to open the door of his vehicle. Lewis reportedly struck the alleged thief and pinned him to the ground until the police arrived.

Championships and accomplishments
Ultimate Fighting Championship
Most knockouts in UFC history (13)
Most knockouts in UFC Heavyweight history (13)
Tied for most finishes in UFC Heavyweight division history (13) (tied with Frank Mir)
Performance of the Night (Four times) 
Fight of the Night (Three times) vs. Travis Browne, Mark Hunt, and Junior dos Santos 
Legacy Fighting Championship
Legacy FC Heavyweight Championship (One time)
One successful title defense
MMAJunkie.com
2018 Comeback of the Year vs. Alexander Volkov
MMADNA.nl
2018 Comeback of the Year.

Mixed martial arts record

|-
|Loss
|align=center|26–11 (1)
|Sergey Spivak
|Submission (arm-triangle choke)
|UFC Fight Night: Lewis vs. Spivak
|
|align=center|1
|align=center|3:05
|Las Vegas, Nevada, United States
|
|-
|Loss
|align=center|
|Sergei Pavlovich
|TKO (punches)
|UFC 277
|
|align=center|1
|align=center|0:55
|Dallas, Texas, United States
|
|-
|Loss
|align=center|26–9 (1)
|Tai Tuivasa
|KO (elbow)
|UFC 271
|
|align=center|2
|align=center|1:40
|Houston, Texas, United States
|
|-
|Win
|align=center|26–8 (1)
|Chris Daukaus
|KO (punches)
|UFC Fight Night: Lewis vs. Daukaus
|
|align=center|1
|align=center|3:36
|Las Vegas, Nevada, United States
|
|-
|Loss
|align=center|25–8 (1)
|Ciryl Gane
|TKO (punches)
|UFC 265
|
|align=center|3
|align=center|4:11
|Houston, Texas, United States
|
|-
|Win
|align=center|25–7 (1)
|Curtis Blaydes
|KO (punch)
|UFC Fight Night: Blaydes vs. Lewis
|
|align=center|2
|align=center|1:26
|Las Vegas, Nevada, United States
|
|-
|Win
|align=center|24–7 (1)
|Aleksei Oleinik
|TKO (punches)
|UFC Fight Night: Lewis vs. Oleinik
|
|align=center|2
|align=center|0:21
|Las Vegas, Nevada, United States
|
|-
|Win
|align=center|23–7 (1)
|Ilir Latifi
|Decision (unanimous)
|UFC 247
|
|align=center|3
|align=center|5:00
|Houston, Texas, United States
|
|-
|Win
|align=center|22–7 (1)
|Blagoy Ivanov
|Decision (split)
|UFC 244
|
|align=center|3
|align=center|5:00
|New York City, New York, United States
|
|-
|Loss
|align=center|21–7 (1)
|Junior dos Santos
|TKO (punches)
|UFC Fight Night: Lewis vs. dos Santos
|
|align=center|2
|align=center|1:58
|Wichita, Kansas, United States
|
|-
|Loss
|align=center|21–6 (1)
|Daniel Cormier
|Submission (rear-naked choke)
|UFC 230
|
|align=center|2
|align=center|2:14
|New York City, New York, United States
|
|-
|Win
|align=center|21–5 (1)
|Alexander Volkov
|KO (punches)
|UFC 229
|
|align=center|3
|align=center|4:49
|Las Vegas, Nevada, United States
|
|-
|Win
|align=center|20–5 (1)
|Francis Ngannou
|Decision (unanimous)
|UFC 226
|
|align=center|3
|align=center|5:00
|Las Vegas, Nevada, United States
|
|-
|Win
|align=center|19–5 (1)
|Marcin Tybura
|KO (punches)
|UFC Fight Night: Cowboy vs. Medeiros
|
|align=center|3
|align=center|2:48
|Austin, Texas, United States
|
|-
|Loss
|align=center|18–5 (1)
|Mark Hunt
|TKO (punches)
|UFC Fight Night: Lewis vs. Hunt
|
|align=center|4
|align=center|3:51
|Auckland, New Zealand
|
|-
|Win
|align=center|18–4 (1)
|Travis Browne
|KO (punches)
|UFC Fight Night: Lewis vs. Browne
|
|align=center|2
|align=center|3:12
|Halifax, Nova Scotia, Canada
|
|-
|Win
|align=center|17–4 (1)
|Shamil Abdurakhimov
|TKO (punches)
|UFC Fight Night: Lewis vs. Abdurakhimov
|
|align=center|4
|align=center|3:42
|Albany, New York, United States
|
|-
|Win
|align=center|16–4 (1)
|Roy Nelson
|Decision (split)
|UFC Fight Night: dos Anjos vs. Alvarez
|
|align=center|3
|align=center|5:00
|Las Vegas, Nevada, United States
|
|-
|Win
|align=center|15–4 (1)
|Gabriel Gonzaga
|KO (punches)
|UFC Fight Night: Rothwell vs. dos Santos
|
|align=center|1
|align=center|4:48
|Zagreb, Croatia
|
|-
|Win
|align=center|14–4 (1)
|Damian Grabowski
|TKO (punches)
|UFC Fight Night: Hendricks vs. Thompson
|
|align=center|1
|align=center|2:17
|Las Vegas, Nevada, United States
|
|-
|Win
|align=center|13–4 (1)
|Viktor Pešta
|TKO (punches)
|UFC 192
|
|align=center|3
|align=center|1:15
|Houston, Texas, United States
|
|-
|Loss
|align=center|12–4 (1)
|Shawn Jordan
|TKO (hook kick and punches)
|UFC Fight Night: Boetsch vs. Henderson
|
|align=center|2
|align=center|0:48
|New Orleans, Louisiana, United States
|
|-
|Win
|align=center|12–3 (1)
|Ruan Potts
|TKO (punches)
|UFC 184
|
|align=center|2
|align=center|3:18
|Los Angeles, California, United States
|
|-
|Loss
|align=center|11–3 (1)
|Matt Mitrione
|KO (punches)
|UFC Fight Night: Jacaré vs. Mousasi
|
|align=center|1
|align=center|0:41
|Mashantucket, Connecticut, United States
|
|-
|Win
|align=center|11–2 (1)
|Guto Inocente
|KO (punches)
|The Ultimate Fighter: Team Edgar vs. Team Penn Finale
|
|align=center|1
|align=center|3:30
|Las Vegas, Nevada, United States
|
|-
|Win
|align=center|10–2 (1)
|Jack May
|TKO (punches)
|UFC on Fox: Werdum vs. Browne
|
|align=center|1
|align=center|4:23
|Orlando, Florida, United States
|
|-
|Win
|align=center|9–2 (1)
|Ricky Shivers
|TKO (punches)
|Legacy FC 18
|
|align=center|3
|align=center|4:22
|Houston, Texas, United States
|
|-
|Win
|align=center|8–2 (1)
|Jared Rosholt
|KO (punches)
|Legacy FC 13
|
|align=center|2
|align=center|4:41
|Dallas, Texas, United States
|
|-
|Win
|align=center|7–2 (1)
|Justin Frazier
|TKO (knee to the body and punches)
|RFA 2
|
|align=center|1
|align=center|2:37
|Kearney, Nebraska, United States
|
|-
|NC
|align=center|6–2 (1)
|Jeremiah Constant
|NC (accidental strikes to back of Constant's head)
|Fight To Win: Paramount Prize Fighting 2012
|
|align=center|1
|align=center|0:48
|Denver, Colorado, United States
|
|-
|Win
|align=center|6–2
|Rakim Cleveland
|TKO (punches)
|Legacy FC 9
|
|align=center|3
|align=center|3:12
|Houston, Texas, United States
|
|-
|Win
|align=center|5–2
|Jay Peche
|TKO (punches)
|Immortal Kombat Fighting
|
|align=center|1
|align=center|0:46
|Spring, Texas, United States
|
|-
|Loss
|align=center|4–2
|Tony Johnson
|Decision (unanimous)
|Bellator 46
|
|align=center|3
|align=center|5:00
|Hollywood, Florida, United States
|
|-
|Win
|align=center|4–1
|Taylor Herbert
|TKO (punches)
|International Xtreme Fight Association
|
|align=center|1
|align=center|2:14
|Houston, Texas, United States
|
|-
|Win
|align=center|3–1
|Rakim Cleveland
|Submission (armbar)
|Worldwide Gladiator
|
|align=center|2
|align=center|1:33
|Pasadena, Texas, United States
|
|-
|Win
|align=center|2–1
|Ryan Martinez
|TKO (punches)
|Fight to Win/King of Champions: Worlds Collide
|
|align=center|2
|align=center|1:03
|Denver, Colorado, United States
|
|-
|Loss
|align=center|1–1
|Shawn Jordan
|Decision (unanimous)
|Cajun Fighting Championships: Full Force
|
|align=center|3
|align=center|5:00
|Lafayette, Louisiana, United States
|
|-
|Win
|align=center|1–0
|Nick Mitchell
|TKO (punches)
|Worldwide Gladiator
|
|align=center|2
|align=center|1:33
|Pasadena, Texas, United States
|

Pay-per-view bouts

See also
 List of current UFC fighters
 List of male mixed martial artists

References

External links
 

Living people
American male mixed martial artists
Heavyweight mixed martial artists
Mixed martial artists utilizing boxing
Mixed martial artists utilizing Brazilian jiu-jitsu
Mixed martial artists from Louisiana
Sportspeople from New Orleans
Ultimate Fighting Championship male fighters
American practitioners of Brazilian jiu-jitsu
Year of birth missing (living people)